Incisa in Val d'Arno is a frazione of the  comune (municipality) of Figline e Incisa Valdarno, in the Metropolitan City of Florence, Tuscany, central Italy, located about  southeast of Florence. It was a separate comune until 1 January 2014.

The church of St. Alexander houses a fragmentary triptych by Andrea di Giusto. The Renaissance poet Petrarch grew up in Incisa, although he was born in Arezzo.

References

External links

Cities and towns in Tuscany